Ribes de Freser is a municipality in the comarca of the Ripollès in Girona, Catalonia. It is situated at the confluence of the Freser, Rigard and 
It is known for its mineral water, 
paper manufacture and milk products, and is also an important tourist centre. A rack railway runs from 
the town to Queralbs and to the shrine of Núria, through the Vall de Núria. The town is on the 
communication route from Barcelona to Puigcerdà (N-152 road and RENFE railway line).

The natural mineral water Aigua de Ribes comes from the spring located in Ribas de Freser, Girona, Spain where it is also bottled.

Demography

See also 
Vall de Núria Rack Railway

References

 Panareda Clopés, Josep Maria; Rios Calvet, Jaume; Rabella Vives, Josep Maria (1989). Guia de Catalunya, Barcelona: Caixa de Catalunya.  (Spanish).  (Catalan).

External links 
 
 Government data pages 

Municipalities in Ripollès
Populated places in Ripollès